is a Japanese former cyclist. He competed in two events at the 1992 Summer Olympics. He rode for Shimano during his career and won the mountains competition at the 1994 Tour de Hokkaido. He worked for the Shimano company after retiring.

References

External links
 

1969 births
Living people
Japanese male cyclists
Olympic cyclists of Japan
Cyclists at the 1992 Summer Olympics
Sportspeople from Osaka Prefecture
Cyclists at the 1990 Asian Games
Asian Games medalists in cycling
Asian Games gold medalists for Japan
Asian Games silver medalists for Japan
Medalists at the 1990 Asian Games
21st-century Japanese people
20th-century Japanese people